Episannina perlucida is a moth of the family Sesiidae. It is known from the Democratic Republic of the Congo and Gabon.

References

Sesiidae
Insects of the Democratic Republic of the Congo
Fauna of Gabon
Moths of Africa